The women's javelin throw event at the 1996 World Junior Championships in Athletics was held in Sydney, Australia, at International Athletic Centre on 21 and 23 August.  An old specification 600g javelin was used.

Medalists

Results

Final
23 August

Qualifications
21 Aug

Group A

Group B

Participation
According to an unofficial count, 23 athletes from 16 countries participated in the event.

References

Javelin throw
Javelin throw at the World Athletics U20 Championships